Karuppu Maya Thevar (15 October 1934 – 9 August 2022) was an Indian politician who served as Member of Parliament from 1973 to 1984, elected from Dindigul, Tamil Nadu.  He was the first AIADMK candidate since its inception to be elected to the Lok Sabha, from Dindigul in the 1973 by-election.

Maya Thevar was credited with selecting the two leaves symbol for the AIADMK in 1973.

He is survived by his wife and two children.

Footnotes

1934 births
2022 deaths
Dravida Munnetra Kazhagam politicians
India MPs 1971–1977
India MPs 1977–1979
India MPs 1980–1984
Lok Sabha members from Tamil Nadu
All India Anna Dravida Munnetra Kazhagam politicians
People from Madurai district
People from Dindigul district